Collegium Hungaricum may refer to ...
Balassi Institute (Collegium Hungaricum), organization supporting Hungarian education and culture around the world
Collegium Germanicum et Hungaricum (Catholic priest's seminary in Rome, Italy).